Siratus hennequini is a species of sea snail, a marine gastropod mollusk in the family Muricidae, the murex snails or rock snails.

Description

Distribution
This marine species occurs off Honduras.

References

 Merle D., Garrigues B. & Pointier J.-P. (2011) Fossil and Recent Muricidae of the world. Part Muricinae. Hackenheim: Conchbooks. 648 pp.
 Houart, R. (2014). Living Muricidae of the world. Muricinae. Murex, Promurex, Haustellum, Bolinus, Vokesimurex and Siratus. Harxheim: ConchBooks. 197 pp.

External links
 Houart, R. (2000). Description of two new species of Chicoreus (Siratus) (Gastropoda, Muricidae) from Honduras and Nicaragua. Novapex. 1 (3-4): 75-82

Siratus
Gastropods described in 2000